Ulhasnagar is an important railway station on the Central line of the Mumbai Suburban Railway network. It is a station for all Slow, Semifast and Fast trains on the Mumbai Suburban Railway system of Maharashtra State, in western India. It is located on the route between Vithalwadi and Ambarnath. Ulhasnagar Railway Station was built in the year 1955.

Gallery

References

Notes
 Dionne Bunsha (17 December 2004). "The States:Ulhasnagar in a new role". The Hindu. Retrieved 24 May 2007. 
 "About Ulhasnagar, Introduction of Ulhasnagar, Ulhasnagar Profile". www.ulhasnagaronline.in. Retrieved 2016-01-09.
 Sindhi conversions in Ulhasnagar raise a storm
 Girish Kuber (2007-01-09). "Pappu's Ulhasnagar gambit may backfire". Economic Times. Retrieved 2007-05-24.
 Yogesh Pawar (3 March 1999). "Three Ps rule Ulhas: Pelf, Politicians & Pappu.and his most trusted man shamsher ansari Ulhasnagar is mainly distributed in 5 areas namely ulhasnagar * 1,2,3,4 and 5". Indian Express. Retrieved 24 May 2007.
 Ulhasnagar Railway Station Near Ramdev Apartment opp CHM College

Railway stations in Thane district
Ulhasnagar
Mumbai Suburban Railway stations
Mumbai CR railway division
Kalyan-Lonavala rail line